Mohammed Mahmood Ali (born 2 March 1953) is an Indian politician serving as the Minister of Home, Prisons, Fire Services of Telangana since 2019. He is the second Home Minister of Telangana, preceded by Naini Narshimha Reddy. He was the Deputy Chief Minister and Minister of Revenue, Stamps and Registrations, Relief and Rehabilitation, Urban Land Ceiling from 2014–2018. He is a member of Telangana Legislative Council .

Early life
Ali was born in Hyderabad and lives in Azampura. He received his Bachelor's degree in Commerce from Osmania University. After his education he ventured in dairy farming business and succeeded well in dairy business.

Political career
Ali was elected as a Member of Legislative Council Andhra Pradesh in 2010. Now he is representing as a Member of Legislative Council Telangana. He belongs to Telangana Rashtra Samithi and is its Minority cell president. He also holds the record for serving longest time as Deputy Chief Minister of Telangana State.

Deputy Chief Minister

On 2 June 2014, Ali was appointed the first ever Deputy Chief Minister of Telangana by Chief Minister K. Chandrasekhar Rao following the party victory in the state's Legislative Assembly election.

Personal life
He is married and has a son and two daughters.
He lives with his wife at Ministers residential colony.

References

External links
 Celebration video on Mohammad Mahmood Ali becoming Deputy Chief Minister of Telangana State

People from Telangana
Telangana Rashtra Samithi politicians
Living people
Members of the Telangana Legislative Council
21st-century Indian politicians
Deputy chief ministers of Telangana
1952 births